The 1980 Central Fidelity Banks International was a women's singles tennis tournament played on indoor carpet courts at the Robins Center in Richmond, Virginia in the United States. The event was part of the AA category of the 1980 Colgate Series. It was the second edition of the tournament and was held from July 21 through July 27, 1980. First-seeded Martina Navratilova won the singles title and earned $20,000 first-prize money.

Finals

Singles
 Martina Navratilova defeated  Mary-Lou Piatek 6–3, 6–0
 It was Navratilova's 10th singles title of the year and the 44th of her career.

Doubles
 Billie Jean King /  Martina Navratilova defeated  Pam Shriver /  Anne Smith 6–4, 4–6, 6–3

Prize money

Notes

References

External links
 International Tennis Federation (ITF) tournament edition details 

Central Fidelity Banks International
Central Fidelity Banks International
Central Fidelity Banks International
Central Fidelity Banks International
Central Fidelity Banks International